Open air, open-air or openair may refer to:
Open Air, a BBC television program
Open-air cinema or outdoor cinema
Open-air concert, a concert taking place outside
Open-air museum, a distinct type of museum exhibiting its collections out-of-doors
Open-air preaching, the act of publicly proclaiming a religious message
Open-air treatment, therapeutic exposure to fresh air and sunshine
Open air school, an outdoor school designed to combat the spread of disease
OpenAIR, a message routing and communication protocol for artificial intelligence systems
Openair Cinemas, an Australasian brand of outdoor cinema events, owned by Pedestrian (company)

See also
Open Air Suit, a studio album by Air
Open Air PM, a defunct daily newspaper in New York City
OpenAIRE, a network of Open Access repositories, archives and journals